Patrick Janvier (born 18 November 1984) is a Haitian footballer, who last played for the LDU Portoviejo of the Ecuadorian Serie B.

References

External links

1984 births
Living people
Haitian footballers
Haiti international footballers
Haitian expatriate footballers
L.D.U. Portoviejo footballers
Association football forwards
Expatriate footballers in Ecuador
Haitian expatriate sportspeople in Ecuador